Uusküla is a village in Alutaguse Parish, Ida-Viru County, in northeastern Estonia. It is located on the northern shore of Lake Peipus. Uusküla has a population of 69 (as of 2000).

References

 

Villages in Ida-Viru County